The Battle of Blanc Mont Ridge (3 October to 27 October 1918) occurred during World War I, northeast of Reims, in Champagne, France. The US Army's 2nd Infantry Division and the 36th Infantry Division alongside the French Fourth Army opposed the Imperial German Army's 200th and 213th divisions, along with portions of six additional German divisions. The result of this battle was the expulsion of the Imperial German Army from the Champagne Region.

Further reading 
, "Forgotten Victory" (Doughboy Center)
 Field Orders for the battle

References

Battles of World War I involving Germany
Battles of World War I involving the United States
Battles of the Western Front (World War I)
United States Marine Corps in the 20th century
Conflicts in 1918
1918 in France